Mawlid is the birth of the Islamic prophet Muhammad.

Mawlid  may also refer to:
 Mawlid al-Barzanjī, a panegyric of the Islamic prophet Muhammad
 Mawlid Hayir, a Somali politician
 Mawlid in Algeria, a celebration of Muhammad's birth in Algeria

See also 
 Mouloud (disambiguation)
 Mouloudia (disambiguation)